Sándor Kónyi (born 3 September 1901, date of death unknown) was a Hungarian wrestler. He competed in the Greco-Roman middleweight event at the 1924 Summer Olympics.

References

External links
 

1901 births
Year of death missing
Olympic wrestlers of Hungary
Wrestlers at the 1924 Summer Olympics
Hungarian male sport wrestlers
Place of birth missing